Tatyana Dmitrievna Bakhteyeva or Tetyana Dmytriyivna Bakhteyeva is a Doctor of Medical Sciences (since 2008), CEO of Donetsk Oblast Clinical Territorial Medical Association, People's Deputy of Ukraine.

Biography
Tatyana Bakhteeva was born on November 27, 1953, in Donetsk, Ukraine. She is divorced, her ex-husband Alimzhan Bakhteev is working in bus transfer services; they have a common daughter Irina Valitova (born 1975), who is teaching at Donetsk Medical University.

Education
In 1977 Bakhteeva graduated from Donetsk Medical University as a GP, in 2002 she obtained Diploma in Economics in Donetsk State University of Economics and Trade named after M. Tugan-Baranovsky; after that she became a People's Deputy of Ukraine from Party of Regions and never returned to medicine. In 2002 she received her Ph.D. in medical sciences with the thesis "Neurotic disorders in women".

In the 2014 Ukrainian parliamentary election she was again re-elected into parliament; this time after placing 9th on the electoral list of Opposition Bloc.

Career

 1977-1980 - therapist, physical therapist, at the hospital No.2 at Yasinovataya station, Donetsk railway
 1980-1991 - district doctor, since 1986 - Deputy Head of medical-labour expert commission at Donetsk city hospital No.3
 since 1991 - Head of Donetsk Regional radiological medical expert commission for Chernobyl liquidators
 1992-1994 - responsible person for Chernobyl children recovery in Cuba
 1994-1997 - Head Doctor at Donetsk Oblast health care center for individuals affected by the consequences of Chernobyl accident
 since 1997 - CEO of Donetsk Oblast Clinical Territorial Medical Association
 1998-2002 - Deputy of Donetsk Oblast Council, member of health committee

Bakhteeva was No.7 in 2010's rating of the 100 most influential Ukrainian women according to Ukrainian magazine Focus. Bakhteeva is the founder of the Donetsk Oblast charity foundation Humaneness and the Honoured Doctor of Ukraine.

Politics
In May 2002 Bakhteeva was elected the People's Deputy of Ukraine from Party of Regions, and has worked in the 4th, 5th, 6th, 8th Verkhovna Radas. In the 5th and 6th Verkhovna Radas, she took the post of Head of Health Care committee.
 Member of the Group of Interparliamentary Relations with Russia
 Member of the Interparliamentary relations with the Swiss Confederation
 Member of the Interparliamentary relations with the Principality of Liechtenstein
 Member of the Group of Interparliamentary Relations with the Republic of Lebanon
 Member of the Group of Interparliamentary Relations with the Republic of Kazakhstan
 Member of the Group of Interparliamentary Relations with  Hellenic Republic.

After 2013 
People's Deputy of Ukraine of 8th convocation from Opposition Bloc. She was Chairman of the Committee on Health Protection.

Regularly visited Donetsk and DPR (last time in 2019). She helped promote the policy of reconciliation to Serhiy Sivokho, an associate of President Zelensky.

At the end of January 2020, the All-Ukrainian public organization Fellowship - Native Donbass was presented in Kyiv. Among the founders are ex-deputy head of the Donetsk Regional State Administration Boris Adamov, multiple champion of the Paralympic Games in swimming, honorary citizen of Donetsk and Slavyansk Viktor Smirnov, three former people's deputies: Bakhteeva, president of the Nord holding Valentin Landik, and Valeriy Konovalyuk.

The ex-deputy standed (until 24 February 2022) for the "special status" of Donbas and against the economic blockade of territories temporarily not controlled by Ukraine.

Bakhteeva managed to get the biggest profits with the help of official powers from tenders together with the Fistal brothers. These are representatives of the Donetsk medical clan close to the Russian special services, whose patriarch is the surgeon of the Donetsk Burn Center, Emil Fistal. Fistals openly support the Russian occupation, registered their companies in the Russian economic space in Donetsk. At the same time, with the support of Bakhteeva, they continued to receive excess profits as "medical tender kings" of Ukraine. In just two years till the end of 2021, $440 mln passed through firms associated with Bakhteeva and the separatists Fistal family, of which up to 30% returned to the beneficiaries of the scheme as kickbacks.

In late 2021 she attended Yukhym Zvyahilsky's funeral.

Critics 
She is close to the businessman Rinat Akhmetov. She has friendly and family ties with the families of Taktashev and Valitov, who are considered to be criminal functionaries from the first circle of "Lord of Donbas". At one time, the partner of the Taktashovs, Valitovs, and Bakhteeva was Andriy Adamovskyi, who is known for the scandal surrounding the Skymall in Kyiv and was considered one of the most influential figures of the "half-world" of Poroshenko's time due to his friendship with ex-People's Deputy Alexandr Granovsky.

Bakhteeva's husband worked for Vladyslav Dreger, who is called a raider in the media, whose path to success began with cooperation with the "17 Precinct" OZU, which is close to the Victor Pshonka family of prosecutors. Bakhteeva's nephew is Rinat Ayzyatulov.

Raisa Bohatyriova and Bakhteeva earned huge fortunes thanks to official influence on medicine. This is the production and certification of medicines; production, certification and recommendation of vaccines; government Procurement; certification of state and private clinics and practices; clan management of pharmacy networks, supply of medical equipment and reagents; supporting the education of rich foreign students in medical universities of Ukraine.

After the Orange Revolution in 2004, Bakhteeva cohabited with Yushchenko's wife, took part in the scandalous "Clinic of the Third Millennium" project.

Since then, Bakhteeva has been friends with the Glib Zagoriy clan, which is close to Poroshenko. Bogatyreva and Bakhteeva are considered the founders of pharmacy addiction (selling tramadol and tramalgin in pharmacies without a prescription).

All the main clans were united in that business at first. Tramadol and Tramalgin were produced in exorbitant volumes by Farmak (family of Pavlo Zhebrivskyi), Darnytsia Zagoriy, Stirol (Yankovskyi) in Horlovka, Biolik in Kharkiv. Stirol was considered the source of Bakhteeva's "tramadol" profits.

Awards
 Order of Princess Olga, III class (2002)
 "Miner's Glory" badge, I, II, III class
 Order of Saint Barbara, given by Ukrainian Orthodox Church
 Certificate of Merit "For Humanism" from the President of Ukraine
 Certificate of Merit from Cabinet of Ministers of Ukraine (2003)

See also
2007 Ukrainian parliamentary election
List of Ukrainian Parliament Members 2007
Verkhovna Rada

References

External links 
  Tatyana Bakhteeva's profile at Verkhovna Rada of Ukraine official web-site

1953 births
Living people
Politicians from Donetsk
Party of Regions politicians
Opposition Bloc politicians
Seventh convocation members of the Verkhovna Rada
Eighth convocation members of the Verkhovna Rada
Recipients of the Order of Princess Olga, 3rd class
21st-century Ukrainian women politicians
Laureates of the State Prize of Ukraine in Science and Technology
Recipients of the Honorary Diploma of the Cabinet of Ministers of Ukraine
Ukrainian medical doctors
Women members of the Verkhovna Rada